Mukhen is an urban-type settlement in Imeni Lazo District, Khabarovsk Krai, Russia. Population:

References

Notes

Sources

Urban-type settlements in Khabarovsk Krai